The 2003 4 Nations Cup was the eighth playing of the annual women's ice hockey tournament. It was held in Skövde, Sweden, from November 5–9, 2003.

Results

Final Table

Final

3rd place

External links
Tournament on hockeyarchives.info

2003–04
2003–04 in Finnish ice hockey
2003–04 in Swedish ice hockey
2003–04 in Canadian women's ice hockey
2003–04 in American women's ice hockey
2003–04
2003–04 in women's ice hockey